Sami Abou-Zeid (January 1, 1979 – October 12, 2009), or Samy Abu Zaid, was a professional Egyptian footballer. He played for Asyut Cement before joining Asyut Petroleum later in his career. Sami died in a car accident on 12 October 2009 while on the way to training. He was accompanied by chief medic Khaled Anwar. Anwar survived the crash with a few knocks.

References

External links
Asyut captain Abou-Zeid dies in car crash

Egyptian footballers
2009 deaths
1979 births
Road incident deaths in Egypt
Association football forwards